Suwon FC Women (Korean: 수원 FC 위민) is a South Korean women's football team based in Suwon.

History 
The club was founded in January 2008 as Suwon Facilities Management Corporation WFC, or simply Suwon FMC. The team plays in the nation's highest league, the WK League, and has won the championship title in 2010.

Before the 2022 WK League season, the club merged with the Suwon FC men's team and changed its name to Suwon FC Women.

Current squad

Backroom staff

Coaching staff
Head coach:  Park Gil-young
Coach:  Lee Seung-hyeon
Goalkeeping coach:  Lee Sang-yeop

Support staff
Fitness coach:  Lee Han-na,  Park Si-eun
Team manager:  Kim Hyo-jin

Source: Official website

Honours
WK League
Winners: 2010
Runners-up: 2019

Records

Year-by-year

References

External links
 Official website 

Suwon FC Women
Women's football clubs in South Korea
Association football clubs established in 2008
Sport in Gyeonggi Province
Sport in Suwon
WK League clubs
2008 establishments in South Korea